Nothing for Juice is the third studio album by the Mountain Goats. It is the last Mountain Goats release to feature Rachel Ware on bass and backing vocals.

Track listing

Personnel
John Darnielle - vocals, guitar
Rachel Ware - bass, vocals

Release history

References

External links
Complete lyrics to the album

1996 albums
The Mountain Goats albums